State Route 255 (SR 255) is a primary state highway in the U.S. state of Virginia. Known as Bishop Meade Highway, the state highway runs  from U.S. Route 17 and US 50 near Millwood north to US 340 at Briggs in southern Clarke County.

SR 255 is a Virginia Byway.

Route description

SR 255 begins at an intersection with US 17 and US 50 (Millwood Pike) south of Millwood. The state highway heads north as a two-lane undivided road through the village of Millwood, the location of several historic sites including the estate Carter Hall. SR 255 continues north through the hamlet of Claytonville. The state highway passes under Norfolk Southern Railway's Hagerstown District before reaching its eastern terminus at US 340 (Lord Fairfax Highway) in the village of Briggs.

Major intersections

References

External links

Virginia Highways Project: VA 255

255
State Route 255
255